Waldemar Zboralski (born 4 June 1960) is a Polish veteran gay rights activist, politician, and journalist.

Life 
Zboralski was born in Nowa Sól where he grew up and graduated from high school.

He became a victim to the secret Operation Hyacinth organised by the Polish communist police. The purpose of the operation was to create a national database of all homosexuals and people who had some sort of contact with them.

Zboralski arrived in Warsaw in 1986 and lived there for two years – from January 1986 to April 1988 – where he was an active participant and organizer of Warsaw gay movement. In 1987, he was a co-founder and the first chairman of Warsaw Gay Movement. In March 1988 Zboralski and a group of 15 people, including Sławek Starosta and Krzysztof Garwatowski, filed a formal application to register the Warsaw Gay Movement. The application was rejected due to an intervention from General Kiszczak, Minister of Internal Affairs, for stated reasons of "public morality".

Zboralski was called by Radio Free Europe's research as a member of “Independent movement in Eastern Europe” for the first time on 17 November 1988.

According to Krzysztof Tomasik, author of the book "Gejerel. Mniejszości seksualne w PRL-u" ("Gayerel. Sexual minorities in PRL"), Zboralski was the "gay Wałęsa", "the main force behind Warsaw gay movement".

Zboralski has been lobbying for the legalization of same-sex marriages in Poland, he was the first person to publish articles on this subject in the Polish press.

In 2003 he was the first person to become an honorary member of a Polish LGBT organization, Campaign Against Homophobia. In 2004, as an openly gay candidate of Reason Party, Zboralski was unsuccessful in elections to the European Parliament. In 2005 he was an unsuccessful openly gay candidate of Union of the Left for the Sejm, the lower house of the Polish parliament.

On 12 October 2007 Zboralski married his partner Krzysztof Nowak in Great Britain as the first Polish gay couple married in that country.

In 2020 he participated in Radio Maryja player for "conversion of as many people as possible from the sin of homosexuality".

Currently he resides in England working as a registered nurse.

References

External links 

Waldemar Zboralski's official webpage 

1960 births
Polish LGBT politicians
Polish LGBT rights activists
Gay politicians
Living people
People from Nowa Sól